"Un Poco De Tu Amor" (English: "A Little Bit of Your Love") is a song by Mexican pop group RBD, released as the fourth single from their debut album Rebelde (2004), only in Mexico. The song became the group's fourth hit in the country.

It was meant to be the album's second single, but was replaced by "Solo Quédate En Silencio" due to the radio airplay and marketing. It became their first to be a radio single.

The song has a version in Portuguese called "Um Pouco Desse Amor" (Eng: "A Little Bit of This Love"), released in the Portuguese edition of their debut album.

2005 singles
RBD songs
Spanish-language songs
2004 songs
EMI Records singles
Songs written by DJ Kafka
Songs written by Max di Carlo
Song recordings produced by Armando Ávila